Christopher Deshun Jones (born July 3, 1994) is an American football defensive tackle for the Kansas City Chiefs of the National Football League (NFL). He played college football at Mississippi State, and was drafted by the Chiefs in the second round of the 2016 NFL Draft.

Early years
Jones attended Houston High School in Houston, Mississippi, where he played high school football for the Hilltoppers. Jones was considered a five-star recruit and was ranked among the top players in his class. He committed to Mississippi State University to play college football.

College career
Jones appeared in all 13 games and made three starts as a true freshman at Mississippi State in 2013. He had 32 tackles and three sacks. As a sophomore, he appeared in all 13 games and had 26 tackles and three sacks. As a junior, he started all 13 games, recording 44 tackles and 2.5 sacks. Following the conclusion of his junior year, Jones made the decision to forgo his senior year and enter the 2016 NFL Draft.

Professional career
Coming out of college, Jones was projected by analysts and scouts to be drafted in the second round. He was ranked the eighth-best defensive tackle and the 48th-best prospect by NFLDraftScout.com. Jones was invited to the NFL Combine and completed the entire workout and all the positional drills. While running the 40-yard dash, Jones had a wardrobe malfunction that exposed his genitalia before falling to the ground to fix the issue. This went viral on social media. He attended Mississippi State's Pro Day, but decided he was satisfied with his combine performance and only performed positional drills.

2016
The Kansas City Chiefs drafted Jones in the second round with the 37th overall pick in the 2016 NFL Draft. Jones was the fifth defensive tackle drafted in 2016.

On May 8, 2016, the Chiefs signed Jones to a four-year, $6.23 million contract with $3.44 million guaranteed and a signing bonus of $2.73 million.

He entered training camp competing with Jaye Howard, Allen Bailey, Nick Williams, and Jimmy Staten to be the starting defensive end. Jones was named the backup left defensive end, behind Jaye Howard, to begin the regular season.

Jones made his professional regular season debut in the Kansas City Chiefs' season-opening 33–27 victory over the San Diego Chargers. The following week, he recorded his first tackle and finished with two solo tackles in a 19–12 loss to the Houston Texans. On October 18, 2016, he was named the starting right defensive end after Allen Bailey was placed on injured-reserve with a shoulder injury. On October 23, 2016, Jones earned his first career start and recorded two solo tackles in a 27–21 win against the New Orleans Saints. The next game, he made a solo tackle and his first career sack on Andrew Luck in a 30–14 victory over the Indianapolis Colts. In a Week 10 matchup with the Carolina Panthers, Jones made three solo tackles and sacked Cam Newton in a 20–17 win. On December 8, 2016, he recorded a season-high five combined tackles in a 21–13 win against the Oakland Raiders. On January 1, 2017, Jones recorded a season-high four solo tackles in a 37–27 win against the San Diego Chargers. He finished his rookie season with 28 combined tackles, two sacks, and four pass deflections in 16 games and 11 starts. He was named to the NFL All-Rookie Team.

2017

On September 17, 2017, in Week 2, Jones recorded three sacks, two forced fumbles, and an interception in a 27–20 win over the Philadelphia Eagles, earning him AFC Defensive Player of the Week. Overall, he finished the 2017 season with 6.5 sacks, 32 total tackles, one interception, seven passes defensed, and four forced fumbles with five starts and 16 appearances.

2018

During Week 5 against the Jacksonville Jaguars, Jones returned an interception 20 yards for a touchdown in the 30–14 victory. Later in the same game, he was ejected for punching Andrew Norwell in his right thigh after an extra point attempt. Jones has recorded a sack in all games from Week 5 to Week 16, setting an NFL record of 11 consecutive games with a sack. Jones broke the NFL record held previously by Simon Fletcher who recorded a sack from Week 11 of 1992 to Week 3 of the 1993 season. Jones was named AFC Defensive Player of the Month for November. He finished the season third in the league with 15.5 sacks, which led the Chiefs, along with 40 combined tackles, five passes defensed, two forced fumbles, and an interception. He was named second-team All-Pro for his performance in 2018. He was ranked 36th by his fellow players on the NFL Top 100 Players of 2019.

2019

In Week 10 against the Tennessee Titans, Jones recorded two sacks on Ryan Tannehill, one of which was a strip sack recovered by teammate Tanoh Kpassagnon, in the 35–32 loss. Jones was named to his first Pro Bowl. Overall, Jones finished the 2019 season with 36 total tackles, nine sacks, one forced fumble, one fumble recovery, and four passes defensed. Jones helped the Chiefs reach Super Bowl LIV. Jones recorded only one tackle, but forced the game’s first turnover and broke up two passes from Jimmy Garoppolo. The Chiefs defeated the San Francisco 49ers 31–20. He was ranked 52nd by his fellow players on the NFL Top 100 Players of 2020.

2020
On March 16, 2020, the Chiefs placed the franchise tag on Jones. On July 15, Jones signed a four-year contract worth $80 million, with $60 million guaranteed. He was placed on the COVID-19 reserve list on November 5, after coming in contact with someone who tested positive for the virus. He was removed the following day. In Week 14, against the Miami Dolphins, he recorded his first career safety on a sack on quarterback Tua Tagovailoa. Jones finished the 2020 season with 36 total tackles, 7.5 sacks, four passes defensed, and two forced fumbles. He was named to his second Pro Bowl. The Chiefs went on to reach Super Bowl LV, but failed to defend their championship after losing to the Tampa Bay Buccaneers 31–9. He was ranked 34th by his fellow players on the NFL Top 100 Players of 2021.

2021
In Week 11, Jones had five tackles, 3.5 sacks, a pass deflection, a forced fumble, and a fumble recovery in a 19-9 win over the Cowboys, earning AFC Defensive Player of the Week. He was named to his third consecutive Pro Bowl. He was ranked 39th by his fellow players on the NFL Top 100 Players of 2022.

2022
In 2022, Jones recorded 44 tackles, 15.5 sacks, 2 forced fumble, and 1 fumble recovery. He helped the Chiefs get the #1 seed in the AFC. The Chiefs defeated the Jacksonville Jaguars in the AFC Divisional Round to set up a rematch with Cincinnati Bengals in the AFC Championship Game. Jones had 2 sacks on Joe Burrow in the Chiefs 23-20 victory. In Super Bowl LVII, Jones recorded 3 tackles in the Chiefs 38-35 win over the Philadelphia Eagles.

NFL career statistics

Regular season

Playoffs

NFL records
Most consecutive games with a sack: 11

Awards and honors
 2× Super Bowl champion (LIV, LVII)
 First-team All-Pro (2022) 
 3× Second-team All-Pro (2018, 2020, 2021)
 4× Pro Bowl (2019–2022)
 PFWA All-Rookie Team (2016)

References

External links

Twitter
Kansas City Chiefs bio
Mississippi State Bulldogs bio

1994 births
Living people
Players of American football from Mississippi
American football defensive tackles
Mississippi State Bulldogs football players
Kansas City Chiefs players
People from Houston, Mississippi
American Conference Pro Bowl players